Army Public School Lansdowne is located in District Pauri of Uttarakhand, in Northern India. Lansdowne, a hill station and a cantt, is at the height of 5500 feet. It is 45 km away from Kotdwara, the railhead and 180 km away from Delhi.

Army Public School traces its origin to Sainik Kinder Garten School back in 1978, when it was inaugurated by J.S Nakai, wife of Army Commander Central Command then, in MES bungalow known as old BRO office. It changed names from the initial one to Sainik School and then Tithwal School.

It was a Regimental run school till March 1993. On 1 April of the same year, it joined the chain of Army Schools run by Army Welfare Education Society (AWES). Until 2007 it was Army School and then upgraded in 2008 as a residential school and renamed as Army Public School Lansdowne.

The school is controlled by the Army Welfare Education Society (AWES) and Garhwal Rifles Regimental Centre, Lansdowne. It is affiliated with Central Board of Secondary Education.

About

The school is situated in Lansdowne. Lansdowne cantt is the Centre of Garhwal Rifles Regiment.

The school has three academic blocks, primary wing, junior wing and senior wing with separate science block and administration block too.

The school has well equipped Science Labs (Physics, Chemistry, Biology, junior science Lab), Social/EarthScience lab, Math-magic lab, two IT labs, one music hall, one arts and crafts room, two audio visual rooms and one resource cell.

The school has a library, a basketball court, a badminton court a football field, and table tennis facilities.

The school publishes its school journal EXPRESSION annually which highlights all academic, co-curricular activities and contribution made by teacher and students.

The school population is divided into four following houses to generate competitive spirit among them:

Academic activities

Various competitions at school level(essay, extempore speech, talk, subject wise quiz and subject based games) and inter school level(quiz, debate) are organized.
Students attend hobby classes of painting & craft and music in their daily schedule. All national days and festivals are celebrated in the school besides Sports and Annual day.

Co-curricular activities

Adventure camp, class picnics, excursion tour, trekking tours, eco club activities pertaining to environment are scheduled.
The school successfully runs a Boys Hostel. Here free tuition classes, coaching classes for professional courses, coaching for NDA, RIMC and Sainik School are the part of daily schedule.

References

1) Army welfare education society.

2) Indian Army public Schools.

External links
 

Indian Army Public Schools
1993 establishments in Uttar Pradesh
Educational institutions established in 1993
Schools in Uttarakhand